Sparwood Secondary School (SSS) is a public high school in Sparwood, British Columbia, Canada. It is part of the School District 5 Southeast Kootenay. The current building was opened in 2008, and its facilities include 22 classrooms, gymnasium (tucker gymnasium), library and computers.

References 

High schools in British Columbia
Educational institutions in Canada with year of establishment missing